George (Georgy/Yuri Viktorovich) Wulff (22 June 1863, Nizhyn (Russian Empire, nowadays Ukraine) – 25 December 1925, Moscow) was a Russian crystallographer.

The Wulff construction, Wulff net, Wulff-Bragg's condition and the mineral wulffite are named after him. Wulff was one of the first to experiment with X-ray crystallography.

References

1863 births
1925 deaths
Physicists from the Russian Empire
19th-century Ukrainian physicists
Crystallographers